Online predators are individuals who commit child sexual abuse that begins or takes place on the Internet.

Conceptions
Internet-facilitated  crimes against minors involve deceit and begin with adults communicating with children over the Internet with the goal of coercing them into illegal sexual activity. Sometimes the sexual abuse happens face to face.

Chat rooms, instant messaging, Internet forums, social networking sites, cell phones, and even video game consoles have issues with online predations. These online areas attract predators because they allow them to have access to make contact with victims without drawing attention. In addition, there is insufficient reliable data concerning the number of minors sharing personal information online due to children's privacy issues. Also, the anonymity of online conversations leads to the disinhibition of minors, making them feel more comfortable and more likely to engage in risky behaviors. This allows predators to use manipulation to put their targets into situations where they will comply with the predator's sexual demands. Initial manipulation often involves introducing the minors to sexual activity, showing them pornography, and requesting sexually explicit information and pictures. This online predatory behavior does not often lead to actual or attempted offline contact, but it could.

Even though it is the mainstream view that predators will use distinct tactics to meet victims, most actual in-person meetings do not involve any deception. In fact, the minors are usually complicit with perpetrators often using promises of love and romance to seduce victims to meet.

Laws 
In Australia, the murder of Carly Ryan in February 2007 led to public opinion pressure which eventually resulted in nationwide legal changes, nicknamed "Carly's Law", being made in 2017 to help protect minors online. Ryan, aged 15, was a victim of online grooming and predatory behaviour, which was considered unique at the time, given that Ryan was the first person in Australia killed by an online predator.

In the U.S., some risks involving online predatory behavior are addressed by the Children's Internet Protection Act, which was passed in 2000. This law required schools and libraries to install filtering and blocking software, to keep students away from obscene and harmful materials and individuals online. A bill called HR 5319 or the "Deleting Online Predators Act of 2006" (DOPA) was later introduced, intensifying the provisions of CIPA. , the bill was effectively defeated.

Some individuals have also initiated actions against laws designed to protect children. Doe v. Shurtleff, 628 F.3d 1217 (10th Cir. 2010), was a United States Court of Appeals for the Tenth Circuit case assessing the constitutionality of Utah Code Ann. § 77-27-21.5, a law that requires sex offenders to register their internet identifiers with the state in order to "assist in investigating kidnapping and sex-related crimes, and in apprehending offenders". In this case, a convicted sex offender, appearing anonymously as John Doe, appealed a decision by the U.S. District Court for the District of Utah to vacate an order enjoining the enforcement of Utah Code Ann. § 77-27-21.5.

Criticism
Cases involving stalking, violence, abduction, rape and/or murder are very rare. Most online sex offenders are young adults who target teens and seduce victims into sexual relationships. They take time to develop the trust and confidence of teens, so the teens see these relationships as romances or sexual adventures. Nearly 75 percent of victims who met offenders face-to-face did so more than once. Most of these offenders are charged with crimes such as statutory rape for non-forcible sexual contact as the victims are, by law, too young to consent. The youth most vulnerable to online sex offenders often have histories of sexual or physical abuse, family problems, and tendencies to take risks both on- and offline. A 2007 study found no cases of minors being targeted by Internet predators on the basis of information they had posted on social media. The research that concluded the statistic that "1 in 5 children are sexually solicited online" is being questioned.

See also

Child pornography
Computer crime
Catfishing
Child grooming
FBI
Cyberbullying
Cyberstalking
Immigration and Customs Enforcement (ICE)
Fantasy defense
National Crime Agency (NCA)
Pedophilia
Relationship between child pornography and child sexual abuse
Stranger
To Catch a Predator

References

External links
 netsmartz.org

Child sexual abuse
Cybercrime
Online child abuse